Facet cells (also known as umbrella cells, capping cells, superficial urotheliocytes) are a type of cells located in the renal pelvis, the ureters,and the urethra. Umbrella cells form the outermost layer of the urothelium, which is a special type of epithelium found in the renal pelvis, the ureters, and the urethra. Umbrella cells are special in that they can contain multiple nuclei. Their apical membrane contains numerous invaginations, which allows the cells to stretch during urination. Umbrella cells are linked together with tight junctions which:
 prevents urine from leaking through the epithelium.
 creates an osmotic barrier. Urine osmolarity can range from 50 to 1200 mmol/L while the normal body osmolarity is 290 mmol/L. The difference between the two could lead to fluid entering or exiting the ureter due to the osmotic pressure.
Umbrella cells contain uroplakin ia, uroplakin ib, uroplakin ii, and uroplakin iii. These increase the strength of the urothelium.

References

Epithelial cells